The 2007 Bayelsa State House of Assembly election was held on April 14, 2007, to elect members of the Bayelsa State House of Assembly in Nigeria. All the 24 seats were up for election in the Bayelsa State House of Assembly.

Seibarugu Werinipre from PDP representing Yenagoa II constituency was elected Speaker, while Nestor Binabo from PDP representing Sagbama II constituency was elected Deputy Speaker.

Results 
The result of the election is listed below.

 Kuruakegha Dorgu from PDP won Southern Ijaw I constituency
 Kalabo Hawkins Dio from PDP won Southern Ijaw II constituency
 Delight Igali from PDP won Southern Ijaw III constituency
 Konbowei Benson from PDP won Southern Ijaw IV constituency
 Victor Sam Ateke from PDP won Brass I constituency
 Amalanyo Yousuo from PDP won Brass II constituency
 Ruby Benjamin from PDP won Brass III constituency
 Emomotimi Fanama from PDP won Sagbama I constituency
 Nestor Binabo from PDP won Sagbama II constituency
 Ebamua Empere from PDP won Sagbama III constituency
 Ebiundu Komonibo from PDP won Kolokuma/Opokuma I constituency
 Fini Angaye from PDP won Kolokuma/Opokuma II constituency
 Aaron Alokpa A. from PDP won Ekeremor I constituency
 Ebiotu Seleketimibi from PDP won Ekeremor II constituency
 Dein Benadoumene from PDP won Ekeremor III constituency
 Nadu Karibo from PDP won Ogbia I constituency
 Robert Enogha from PDP won Ogbia II constituency
 Walamam S. Igrubia from PDP won Ogbia III constituency
 Egba Alfred from PDP won Yenagoa I constituency
 Seibarugu Werinipre from PDP won Yenagoa II constituency
 Franklin Otele from PDP won Yenagoa III constituency
 Jonathan Obuebite from PDP won Nembe I constituency
 James Ayobegha from PDP won Nembe II constituency
 Otobo Noah Opusiri from PDP won Nembe III constituency

References 

House of Assembly
Bayelsa State House of Assembly elections
Bayelsa